Norbert Schwarz is Provost Professor in the Department of Psychology and the USC Marshall School of Business at the University of Southern California and a co-director of the USC Dornsife Mind and Society Center.

Education
He received a Ph.D. in sociology from the University of Mannheim, Germany (1980) and a habilitation in psychology from the University of Heidelberg, Germany (1986). Schwarz taught at the University of Heidelberg from 1981 to 1992 and served as Scientific Director of ZUMA, now GESIS, an interdisciplinary social science research center (1987–1992). From 1993 to 2013, he worked at the University of Michigan, Ann Arbor, where he held appointments as the Charles Horton Cooley Collegiate Professor of Psychology in the Social Psychology program, Professor of Marketing at the Ross School of Business, Research Professor in the Program in Survey Methodology, and Research Professor at the Institute for Social Research. He was a Fellow at the Center for Advanced Study in the Behavioral Sciences (2000/01; 2009/10) and held visiting positions at universities in Europe (e.g., University of Würzburg, Germany) and Asia (e.g., Hong Kong University of Science and Technology).

A bibliometric analysis  lists him among the 0.1% most frequently cited scientists across all fields of science in the Scopus database, 1997-2017. A core theme of his work is that people do not have stable, coherent and readily accessible attitudes that can be reliably measured through self-report. Instead, opinions are constructed on the spot and recent, contextual factors exert a disproportionate influence on judgments. These influences include feelings (such as moods, emotions, and metacognitive experiences), inferences about the meaning implicit in questions, and whether feelings and thoughts are used to form a representation of the target of judgment or the standard against which it is compared.

Feelings as information
Norbert Schwarz proposed the "feelings-as-information" hypothesis, one of the most influential explanations for the cognitive consequences of affect. According to this perspective, when people make judgments about a target, they rely upon their feelings as diagnostic information about the target of judgment. Although this generally produces accurate responses, people sometimes make mistakes about the source of this information. This hypothesis is well demonstrated by mood effects where people tend to evaluate various targets more positively when they are in a good mood than in a bad mood.  For instance, people report higher life satisfaction when they are in a good mood on a sunny day rather than in a bad mood on a rainy day. However, if the interviewer mentions the weather before they ask the life satisfaction question, this mood effect disappears because people accurately attribute their current mood to the weather rather than their life satisfaction.

In other work from the feelings-as-information perspective, Schwarz suggests that metacognitive experiences, such as the feeling of ease or difficulty in recalling or processing information, can exert significant influence on judgments. In other words, people tend to make judgments based on this interpretation of their subjective feelings of ease or difficulty in information processing. Such feelings can come from a variety of different sources that are irrelevant to a judgment. For example, the feeling of effort can be elicited by contextual features such as the demands of the task (trying to come up with a few versus many exemplars), processing fluency (high or low figure-ground contrast, easy- versus difficult-to-read fonts) and motor movements (brow contraction). Effortful feelings produced by these manipulations can influence judgments about truth, frequency, risk, and beauty: Easy-to-process stimuli are viewed as more accurate, more likely, less risky, and more beautiful.

For instance, his work has shown that people tend to conclude that they are more assertive when they are asked to recall 6 instances of assertive behavior (an easy task), compared to 12 instances of their own assertiveness (a difficult task), even though the people asked to list 12 instances end up generating more examples of assertive behavior. This demonstrates that the meaning of thought content is informed by the experience of thinking about it.

As another example, inferences about familiarity can be drawn from feelings of ease. As a result, when a sentence such as "Orsono is a city in Chile", is presented in easy-to-read print fonts, people tend to judge it as true more often than when it is presented in hard-to-read print fonts. This effect is presumably driven by people's inference based on their naïve theory that easily processed statements are likely to have been encountered before, and therefore, are likely to be true.

Gricean Maxims and survey response
Norbert Schwarz is also well known for his research on cognitive processes underlying survey response. This work generally treats the survey interview context as a conversation between the researcher and the respondent. According to this logic, surveys are governed by the cooperative principle advanced by Paul Grice, the late philosopher of language. Put simply, the cooperative principle states that people try to communicate clearly and truthfully, in as much detail as required (but not more so), giving only relevant information. In Schwarz's view, the respondent not only follows the Gricean maxims (Quality, Quantity, Relation, and Manner) when responding to surveys but also assumes that the questions the interviewer asks are guided by the same principles.

Schwarz's research implicates the operation of these maxims during various stages of the survey question and answering process, and highlights how features of the research instrument can significantly impact the answers obtained. For example, when asked about how successful their lives have been, individuals' responses depended on the range of a scale. "When the numeric values ranged from 0 ('not at all successful') to 10 ('extremely
successful'), 34 percent of the respondents endorsed values between 0 and 5. However, only 13 percent endorsed formally equivalent values between -5 and 0, when the scale ranged from -5 ('not at all successful') to +5 ('extremely successful')." Presumably this is because the survey respondent assumes that negative integers refer to the presence of negative features, while smaller positive integers refer to the absence of positive features.

Similarly, Schwarz has found that when a question about marital satisfaction precedes a question about general life satisfaction, responses for the two questions are highly correlated because the first question renders information about one's marriage highly accessible, but other studies have found the same correlation when the marital satisfaction question is asked after the general life satisfaction question, presumably because marital satisfaction is chronically accessible. Schwarz also found that this correlation vanishes when the two questions are framed as subordinate parts of a larger question, presumably because the respondent infers that the interviewer does not want redundant information and thus marital satisfaction should be specifically subtracted from general life satisfaction. Similar reasoning has been applied to understanding the relation between people's ratings of social groups' central tendency and variability.

Categorization and judgment
Norbert Schwarz's work on categorization and mental construal led to the development of his inclusion/exclusion model that accounts for the emergence of contrast and Assimilation effects in social judgments. Contrast effects occur when exposure to valenced information influences judgments in a way that is incongruent with the valenced information. Assimilation effects occur when exposure to valenced information influences judgments in a way that is congruent with the valenced information. The key insight of the inclusion/exclusion model is that the evaluation of a target of judgment requires bringing to mind both the target itself, and a standard against which it is to be evaluated. Whether valenced information produces contrast or assimilation depends on whether it is included within the target (assimilation) or in the standard against which it is compared (contrast).

Therefore, by manipulating a given piece of information as either included within the target or compared against, the same information can have different consequences for judgments. For example, thinking of a politician involved in a scandal (such as Eliot Spitzer) may make people believe that politicians in general are more corrupt because the corrupt exemplar is information that is included within the representation of "politicians". In short, people would be left thinking "they are all like Spitzer". Paradoxically, at the same time every individual politician that is rated may seem more honest, because for these judgments, the exemplar is used as the standard of comparison. In this case, people are left thinking "he (or she) is not as bad as Spitzer".

References

External links

1953 births
Living people
German psychologists
Ross School of Business faculty
University of Mannheim alumni
Heidelberg University alumni
Social psychologists
Emotion psychologists
American cognitive psychologists